Madeleine Angela Polland (31 May 1918 – 2005) was a prolific Irish children's author.

Life and career
Born Madeleine Angela Cahill in Kinsale, County Cork, Ireland on 31 May 1918, her father moved the family to England while she was still in school. She attended Hitchin Girls' Grammar School in Hertfordshire from 1929 to 1937. She went on to work as an assistant librarian in Letchworth, Hertfordshire, from 1939 until 1942 and again from 1945 to 1946. In the Second World War she worked for the Women's Auxiliary Air Force at a radar installation (1942–1945).

In 1946, she married Arthur Joseph Polland. They had two children. Polland also wrote under the name Frances Adrian. She lived in later years in Málaga, Spain.  Pollard wrote historical fiction which spanned multiple countries. She travelled to many of the locations herself.

Bibliography

Children of the Red King, 1960
The Town across the Water, 1961
Beorn the Proud, 1961
Fingal's Quest, 1961
The White Twilight, 1962
Chuiraquimba and the Black Robes, 1962
City of the Golden House, 1963
The Queen's Blessing, 1963
Flame over Tara, 1964
Thicker Than Water, 1964
Mission to Cathay, 1965
Queen without Crown, 1965
Deirdre, 1967
The Little Spot of Bother (in the U.S. as Minutes of a Murder), 1967
To Tell My People, 1968
Stranger in the Hills, 1968
Random Army (in the U.S. as Shattered Summer), 1969
To Kill a King, 1970
Alhambra, 1970
A Family Affair, 1971
Package to Spain, 1971
Daughter to Poseidon (in the U.S. as Daughter of the Sea), 1972
Prince of the Double Axe, 1976
Double Shadow, 1977
Sabrina, 1979
All Their Kingdoms, 1981
The Heart Speaks Many Ways, 1982
No Price Too High, 1984
As It Was in the Beginning, 1987
Rich Man's Flowers, 1989
The Pomegranate House, 1992

References

20th-century Irish women writers
1918 births
2005 deaths
Irish children's writers
Irish women children's writers
Women in World War II
Pseudonymous women writers
20th-century pseudonymous writers